The Ghauri-II (Urdu:غوری-اا; official codename: Hatf–VA Ghauri–II), is a Pakistani surface-to-surface medium range guided ballistic missile designed and developed by the Khan Research Laboratories. It is a single-stage liquid fuel missile system and a longer ranged variant of the Ghauri-I. The development of Ghauri-II took place in a direct response to India's Agni II. It was developed by increasing the length of the motor assembly and using improved propellants.

The Ghauri–II enjoyed distinction of being Pakistan's longest range missile until its limit was exceeded by the successful launch of the Shaheen-II which was tested in 2004.

Design
It is 18.0 m in length, has a diameter of 1.35 m and a launch weight of 17,800 kg. Its payload is a single separating warhead weighing 1,200 kg, or as low as 750 kg for use at its maximum range. This may used to carry a 250 kg warhead of a 15 to 30 kt yield nuclear, HE or sub-munition warhead. The missile uses a single-stage liquid propellant rocket motor.

The Ghauri-II design improves accuracy by an employing mechanisms that spin the single booster stage and warhead combination approximately 10 seconds before the termination of the powered flight phase at 110 seconds. At this point, the warhead is then separated from the booster stage to fly on a re-entry trajectory that remains stable to its target, greatly enhancing the missile's accuracy. With the addition of GPS targeting the warhead accuracy is further enhanced.

Like most Pakistani missile systems, transporter erector launcher (TEL) vehicles are used to transport and launch Ghauri II.

Developments and tests

The development of Ghauri-II took place in 1993 at the Khan Research Laboratories (KRL) after the government issued orders and released funds for it. After heavy reengineering and subsequent reverse engineering led the improvements of Ghauri-II, and synergizing expertise from various strategic organizations allowed the Ghauri project to continue into Ghauri II and III missiles, whose ranges were intended to reach more deeply into India. Unlike Ghauri-I, the development on the second variant was kept extremely secretive and very few officials, including its chief designer, knew about the existence of the program. The Ghauri-II was launched in a direct response to India's development on Agni-II and the project took place at the KRL. The development on Ghauri-II remains extremely secretive and very few details were made to public in 1999.

On 11 April 1999, India announced to the hold the tests for the Agni-II, prompting Pakistan's reaction. On 14 April 1999, the Ghauri-II was test fired from a Tilla-Jagun Test Range. Pakistani news media inccorrectly broadcast the news that it was a re-test of the Ghauri-I; this was contradicted by Prime Minister Nawaz Sharif on 14 April 1999. The Ghauri-II was launched at 1035hrs local time (0535 GMT) and its spaceflight hit a target 1150 km away near the coastal town of Jiwani on the Balochistan coast. The test was described as "successful", and the missile had taken the spaceflight more than 620 mi (997.93 km) in 12 minutes after being fired from a site in the central province of Punjab.

The Ghauri-II enjoyed its distinction of being the longest range missile in service with Pakistan military, until its limit was exceeded by the successful launch of the Shaheen-II in 2004.

See also
 Ballistic missile
 Liquid fuel rocket
Related developments
 Ghauri (missile)
 Ghauri-III

References

Medium-range ballistic missiles of Pakistan
Military equipment introduced in the 1990s